Vilis Krištopans (born 13 June 1954 in Omsk Oblast, Russian SFSR) is a Latvian politician. He was the Prime Minister of Latvia from 26 November 1998 to 15 July 1999.

As a prime minister he was a member of the Latvian Way political party. He then left politics and, in 2002, returned as a member of parliament from the Union of Greens and Farmers.
Prior to being prime minister, he was the minister of transport.

See also
 Krištopans cabinet

References

1954 births
Living people
People from Omsk Oblast
Latvian Way politicians
Latvia First politicians
Prime Ministers of Latvia
Deputies of the 5th Saeima
Deputies of the 6th Saeima
Deputies of the 7th Saeima
Deputies of the 8th Saeima
Deputies of the 14th Saeima
Riga Technical University alumni